Meri Andraković (born 28 June 2000) is a Croatian singer.  She rose to fame after participating in season one of RTL Televizija's Zvjezdice. In 2020 Andraković released her debut album Voli through Croatia Records.

Life and career
Meri Andraković was born on 28 June 2000 in Osijek, Croatia and grew up in the nearby town of Belišće. She has been engaged in amateur singing since childhood.

In early 2015 she was annonced as one of the participants in season one of RTL Televizija's Zvjezdice. She reached the top six before leaving the contest. Andraković's first single "Sve sam tebi oprostila ja" was released in 2016. In early 2018 she signed a record deal with Croatia Records. Since 2018 she has been collaborating with music producer Boris Đurđević. Andraković's debut album Voli was released on 3 December 2020. 

On 9 December 2022, Andraković was announced as one of the 18 participants in Dora 2023, the national contest in Croatia to select the country's Eurovision Song Contest 2023 entry, with the song "Bye Bye Blonde".

Discography

Albums

Singles

References

External links

2000 births
Croatian pop singers
21st-century Croatian women singers
Living people
People from Osijek